In enzymology, an ADP deaminase is an enzyme that catalyzes the chemical reaction

ADP + H2O  IDP + NH3

Thus, the two substrates of this enzyme are ADP and H2O, whereas its two products are IDP and NH3.

This enzyme belongs to the family of hydrolases, those acting on carbon-nitrogen bonds other than peptide bonds, specifically in cyclic amidines.  The systematic name of this enzyme class is ADP aminohydrolase. Other names in common use include adenosine diphosphate deaminase, and adenosinepyrophosphate deaminase.

References

 

EC 3.5.4
Enzymes of unknown structure